Kinetix (Zoë Saugin of the planet Aleph) is a superheroine appearing in the DC Comics universe, primarily as a member of the Legion of Super-Heroes in the 30th and 31st centuries. She first appeared in Legion of Super-Heroes (vol 4) #66, in March 1995.

Fictional character biography
Zoe's mother Azra was a renowned archeologist who shuttled her and her younger brother Thanot around the galaxy on her digs. One day, Azra inhaled poisonous gas while on a dig, which started eating away at her lungs. Feeling helpless as she watched her mother die, Zoe searched through Azra's books and found a magical incantation using the Moon of Kol, an artifact her mother had found. Apparently, the Moon could transform a "drop of love into a wellspring of health" once in a lifetime. Zoe managed to heal her mother, and thus began her lust for power - but only to be used to help others and achieve self-perfection. However, while her reasons were noble, Zoe's power lust became obsessive.

Zoe spent the next few years searching for more sources of magic which she could use. She found one while exploring caverns on Saturn's moon Titan, where she found and absorbed an energy pool which unlocked her telekinetic abilities. Zoe named herself "Kinetix", (as in "telekinetics"), and joined the Legion of Super-Heroes as part of the second set of draftees alongside Shrinking Violet, who later became her best friend. Zoe would become a major asset to the Legion, being part of the team chosen to pursue Tangleweb and helping delay the Composite Man, allowing the team to regroup. She also developed a crush on deputy leader Leviathan, who developed an even bigger one on her.

Zoe then continued to search for more power and located the Star of Akkos, thinking it would increase her powers, along with Shrinking Violet. The Star instead robbed Zoe of her powers. Zoe went on a leave of absence to look for a way to restore her powers. She was traveling through a stargate when rogue Daxamites destroyed her destination stargate, leaving her stranded. Her life support was running out when she was saved by the sorceress Mysa and brought to Zerox, the Sorcerer's World.

Mysa trained Zoe in the mystic arts and restored her telekinesis, altering her appearance in the process; Zoe's skin became paler, with a tattoo on her cheek, pointed elf-like ears, and a tail. Mysa sent Zoe back to the Legion to find the Emerald Eye. Unbeknownst to Zoe, her best friend Violet had already been possessed by the Eye.

When their mutual crush Leviathan sacrificed himself to save the team from Doctor Regulus, Violet went berserk and revealed her possession by the Emerald Eye and then possessed the Legion to find a way to revive Leviathan. Zoe was in the Eye's thrall and tried to take the Eye for herself, but was rejected by it and nearly killed.

Zoe, reeling from Leviathan's loss and Violet's possession, was transported by Mysa back to Zarrox along with her family and some of her teammates. Mysa was about to drain Zoe of her powers again to punish her for not being able to find the Eye first, but Azra then revealed that she had met Mysa before while she was near death, and had used a mystic artifact to heal her. Azra was pregnant with Zoe at the time and the artifact's energies forged a link between Zoe and Mysa, which allowed Mysa to manipulate Zoe later in life, and also changed Zoe's genetic structure, giving her an affinity for magic which enabled her to absorb the energy pool on Titan. Azra shamed Mysa into admitting her debt, and used the Star of Akkos to restore Zoe's powers and original appearance. Kinetix went on to be instrumental in the defeat of Mordru and freeing Violet from the Eye.

On a mission to explore a mysterious space-time anomaly, Zoe was so enthralled by its power that she became almost catatonic. Her normally bubbly, energetic personality became submerged, leaving her silent and almost childlike. Concerned, Violet and Spark convinced teammate Brainiac 5 to use the Anywhere Machine to convince Zoe to shut out the awe she felt at the power and return to normal. Zoe was one of the Legionnaires who were Blighted, or brainwashed and re-engineered into hunters and killers. Several of her teammates were lost and the Legion disbanded shortly thereafter trying to seal a spatial rift. After the Legion disbanded, Kinetix joined the Science Police and was stationed on Earth.

When the "Terrorforms" changed the people of Earth, Zoe was among the genetic few who became a Terrorform. As a Terrorform, Zoe was linked to the planetary biosphere and responsible, with her fellow Terrorforms, for safeguarding and speeding up the evolutionary process on Earth. Zoe was a unique Terrorform in that she still possessed a shred of her old personality and memories, thanks to her background in magic. Zoe rejoined the Legion after it was reformed and played a key role in stopping Ra's al Ghul. She was part of the team until the Fatal 500 crisis, and was stuck in Limbo along with the rest of the Legion.

Kinetix has not been shown to be a member of the current version of the Legion, which has its own internal chronology and history separate from previous versions.

The post-Zero Hour Legion later emerged from Limbo and joined the fight against the reformed Legion of Super-Villains. Kinetix took on Superboy-Prime and dropped her guard, unaware of his resistance to magic. Superboy-Prime killed Kinetix with his heat vision and Mordru absorbed her magic and memories.

Powers and abilities
Kinetix possessed telekinetic abilities, which she primarily used to manipulate and reshape solid matter with her thoughts. As a Terrorform, her abilities were undefined, partially as they are reactive to the circumstances she is in. She has been shown to possess healing abilities, flight, superhuman strength, the ability to survive unaided in space, and control of gravity. The Legion of the Three Worlds miniseries reveals that Kinetix had absorbed the magic of the home universe of Earth-247 after its destruction, making her stronger than ever.

References

External links
A Hero History Of Kinetix

DC Comics metahumans
DC Comics aliens
DC Comics characters who use magic
DC Comics characters with superhuman strength
DC Comics extraterrestrial superheroes
DC Comics female superheroes
DC Comics witches
Fictional characters with gravity abilities
DC Comics telekinetics